Sluda is a rural locality (a village) in Totemsky District of Vologda Oblast, Russia. Population: 9 (2002).

Rural localities in Totemsky District